Twisted Cyclone, formerly known as Georgia Cyclone, is a steel roller coaster located at Six Flags Over Georgia in Austell, Georgia. Manufactured by Rocky Mountain Construction (RMC), the ride opened to the public on May 25, 2018. It features RMC's patented I-Box Track technology and utilizes a significant portion of Georgia Cyclone's former support structure. Originally constructed by the Dinn Corporation, Georgia Cyclone first opened on March 3, 1990.

History
Georgia Cyclone opened as a mirror image of the Coney Island Cyclone on March 3, 1990. For the 2012 season, approximately 30 percent of the coaster's track was replaced with Topper Track by Rocky Mountain Construction (RMC), intended to provide an improved ride experience. On July 17, 2017, park officials announced that the attraction would close permanently two weeks later on July 30.

On August 31, 2017, Six Flags Over Georgia announced plans to convert Georgia Cyclone into a steel-hybrid design called Twisted Cyclone, featuring RMC's patented I-Box Track technology.

Ride layout

Georgia Cyclone (1990–2017)
Riders were immediately sent down a  drop at a 53° angle; at the bottom of the drop, riders came close to the track above for a headchopper effect. The train then rose up into the first high-speed U-turn to the right, descended again beneath the lift hill and rising into a camelback airtime hill. The train entered a left-hand turnaround, which was then followed by another airtime hill and third left turnaround. Riders navigated another pair of turns under the structure with a series of smaller hills under the main structure before making a final flat turn over the bottom of the first drop, leading into the brake run. From there, the train passed through the transfer track and made its way into the station. A ride on the Georgia Cyclone lasted approximately 1 minute and 48 seconds.

Twisted Cyclone (2018–present) 
Upon leaving the station, the train proceeds through several twisted bunny hills while making a left-hand turnaround into the  lift hill. At the top, riders are released into a drop at 75° and rise into the first of three inversions; a so-called step-up-under-flip. The train sweeps to the right through the turnaround and exit through a barrel roll down drop inversion, which is identical to the first inversion minus the train's direction. The train passes through a wall stall facing away from the lift hill and a hasty turnaround wave turn. Another airtime hill leads to the layout's third and final inversion - a zero-g roll - and a pair of low-ground airtime hills before entering the final left-hand turnaround. Another small airtime hill follows, and riders dip up into the final brake run, which leads back to the station. From dispatch to brake run, one ride on Twisted Cyclone lasts approximately 1 minute and 20 seconds.

Awards

References

External links
 

Hybrid roller coasters
Roller coasters operated by Six Flags
Roller coasters introduced in 1990
Roller coasters in Georgia (U.S. state)
Six Flags Over Georgia